The 2003 El Paso mayoral election was held on May 3, 2003 to elect the mayor of El Paso, Texas. It saw the election of Joe Wardy, who unseated incumbent mayor Raymond Caballero.

This was the first El Paso mayoral election held under new rules which saw a shift from the previous system under which a nonpartisan primary was followed by a general election of the top-two finishers to a new system in which a runoff is held only if no candidate receives a majority of the vote in the first round. This was the last El Paso mayoral election to a two-year term, as terms were to be extended to four-years beginning with the subsequent 2005 election.

No runoff was required, as Wardy secured a majority of the vote in the initial round.

Results

References

 

El Paso
El Paso
Mayoral elections in El Paso, Texas
Non-partisan elections